Herschmann, Herschman, or Hershman may refer to:

People

Surname
Herschmann:
Eric Herschmann (born 1962), American political advisor and attorney
Otto Herschmann (1877–1942), Austrian Jewish Olympian medalist in swimming and fencing; Holocaust victim
Nicole Herschmann (born 1975), German bobsledder

Herschman:

Hershman:
Brandt Hershman, American politician
Joel Hershman, American film director, writer, and producer
Mordechai Hershman (1888–1940), Russian-Jewish cantor ("hazzan") and singer
Lisa Hershman, American author

See also
 Hirschman, surname
 Hirshman, surname